Diana Shaw is an American attorney and government official serving as the acting inspector general of the Department of State.

Education 
Shaw earned a Bachelor of Arts degree from Pepperdine University, a Juris Doctor from the USC Gould School of Law, and Master of Arts in English literature from the University of Oxford.

Career 
Shaw previously served as Assistant Inspector General of the United States Department of Homeland Security for Special Reviews and Evaluations.  She also served as deputy inspector general of the Department of State prior to the departure of Stephen Akard.

References 

American lawyers
Living people
Trump administration personnel
Pepperdine University alumni
USC Gould School of Law alumni
United States Department of Homeland Security officials
United States Department of State officials
United States Inspectors General by name
Year of birth missing (living people)